Castle Bromwich railway station was a railway station in the Castle Bromwich area of Solihull opened by the Birmingham and Derby Junction Railway in 1842.

It was on the line into Birmingham Lawley Street from Water Orton.

Regular passenger services finished in 1968 but afterwards occasional excursions served the station for a few years but unknown when these ceased.

Services

References

 (for coordinates)

External links
 Castle Bromwich station - Warwickshire Railways

Disused railway stations in Birmingham, West Midlands
Railway stations in Great Britain opened in 1842
Railway stations in Great Britain closed in 1968
Former Midland Railway stations
1842 establishments in England